Machii (written:  lit. "town well" or ) is a Japanese surname. Notable people with the surname include:

, Japanese freestyle skier
, Japanese mob boss
, Japanese swordsman

Japanese-language surnames